Georgios "George" Tsiakos (alternate spelling: Giorgos) (Greek: Γιώργος Τσιάκος; born July 19, 1982) is a Greek professional basketball player. He is a 2.06 m (6 ft 9 in) tall power forward-center.

Professional career
Tsiakos won the Greek 2nd Division championship in 2014, with AEK Athens.

National team career
Tsiakos was a member of the junior national teams of Greece. With Greece's junior national team, he played at the 2002 FIBA Europe Under-20 Championship, where he won a gold medal. With Greece's under-26 national team, he won the silver medal at the 2005 Mediterranean Games.

References

External links
Official Facebook Profile 
FIBA Profile
FIBA Europe Profile
RealGM.com Profile
Eurobasket.com Profile
Hellenic Federation Profile 

1982 births
Living people
AEK B.C. players
A.E.L. 1964 B.C. players
BK Ventspils players
Dafnis B.C. players
CB Inca players
Centers (basketball)
Competitors at the 2005 Mediterranean Games
Greek men's basketball players
Holargos B.C. players
Ilysiakos B.C. players
Kavala B.C. players
Kolossos Rodou B.C. players
Koroivos B.C. players
Maroussi B.C. players
Mediterranean Games medalists in basketball
Mediterranean Games silver medalists for Greece
Near East B.C. players
Panelefsiniakos B.C. players
Panionios B.C. players
P.A.O.K. BC players
Peristeri B.C. players
Power forwards (basketball)
Basketball players from Athens